"Sunrise" is the second single released by Caroline, recut from her debut album Murmurs. The single features the title track, as well as two remixes: a remix of Sunrise by Logreybeam, and a remix of Everylittlething by DJ Poignant. The single cover artwork was made by Caroline's sister Olivia.

Track listing
Sunrise
Sunrise (Logreybeam Mix)
Everylittlething (Poignant Mix)

External links
Temporary Residence Page

2006 singles